Liebenstein Castle  is a castle in Liebenstein in the Ilm-Kreis, Thuringia, Germany. It was originally built in the 12th century by the counts of Käfernburg; the castellans were the counts' ministeriales, the lords of Liebenstein.

The castle was extensively reconstructed in the 16th century, and subsequently used as a quarry for building-stone.

References
 Dehio, Georg, 2003: Handbuch der deutschen Kunstdenkmäler, Ausgabe für Thüringen. Munich: Deutscher Kunstverlag. 

Castles in Thuringia
Buildings and structures in Ilm-Kreis